Afferentur regi (Led to the king), WAB 1, is a motet, which Anton Bruckner composed on 7 November 1861 on the text of the Offertorium of the .

History 

Afferentur regi is the second of the two "great motets" during a "fruitful though brief" period of Bruckner's compositional career following Sechter's tuition, the other motet being the Ave Maria WAB 6. Afferentur regi was premiered in St. Florian Abbey on the feast day of Saint Lucy, 13 December 1861.

An early draft for choir alone was found in a monastic archive at Kremsmünster Abbey. The original manuscript is not extant, but several transcriptions were found in the archive of St. Florian Abbey. Many years later, in 1885, Bruckner dedicated the work as an Offertorium als Graduale (offertory as gradual) to Johann Baptist Burgstaller, choir director of the New Cathedral in Linz.

The work was edited in 1922 as an addendum to band 11–12 of Musica Divina, Vienna.

Text 
{|
|
|style="padding-left:2em;"|<poem>She is led to the king,
with the young women, her friends.
With joy and laughter shall they be brought to you!
a grand entrance to the king's palace!<ref>[http://www3.cpdl.org/wiki/index.php/Afferentur_regi Afferentur regi on ChoralWiki]</ref></poem>
|}

 Setting 

The 38-bars piece scored in F major for mixed choir and three trombones ad libitum is a polyphonic offertory. The piece is in ternary form, with an opening motive drawn from a pre-existing Latin plainchant.
In the first part (bars 1–7), "Afferentur regi" is sung in canon by the alto and tenor voices, and with inverted motif by the bass and soprano voices. A similar pattern is repeated in bars 8–15 on "proximae ejus". The middle section (bars 15–24), which begins with "et exultatione" by the bass, similarly as "usque in aeternum" in bars 299-309 of Bruckner's later Te Deum, is stylistically similar to faux bourdon, a technique employed primarily in medieval and Renaissance music. It is followed by a general pause. The third part (bars 25–38) on "adducentur in templum" begins as the first part and ends on a pedal point on the tonic.

Keith W. Kinder suggests that its use of counterpoint may be a reflection of Bruckner's sense of liberation from the "prohibition on free composition" imposed by his former composition teacher, Simon Sechter. Dermot Gault notes that in this work Bruckner "wears his learning lightly" in the contrapuntal writing.

Bruckner quoted from the Afferentur regi in the movement Qui cum Patre et Filio, part of the Credo of the Mass in D minor.

 Selected discography 
Bruckner's Afferentur regi was recorded at first in 1965 by Giulio Bertola with the Coro Polifonico Italiano a cappella (LP: Angelicum LPA 5989)

A selection of the about 30 recordings:
 Simon Halsey, City of Birmingham Symphony Wind Ensemble & Chorus, Bruckner: Mass in E minor & Motets – Conifer CDCF 192, 1990
 Hans-Christoph Rademann, NDR Chor Hamburg, Anton Bruckner: Ave Maria – Carus 83.151, 2000
 Dan-Olof Stenlund, Malmö Chamber Choir, Ausgewählte Werke.  MKKCD 051, 2004
 Michael Stenov, Cantores Carmeli, Benefizkonzert Karmelitenkirche Linz – CD/DVD issued by the choir, 2006, and on YouTube.
 Duncan Ferguson, Choir of St. Mary's Cathedral of Edinburgh, Bruckner: Motets  – CD: Delphian Records DCD34071, 2010
 Philipp Ahmann, MDR Rundfunkchor Leipzig, Anton Bruckner & Michael Haydn - Motets – SACD: Pentatone PTC 5186 868, 2021

 References 

 Sources 
 Max Auer, Anton Bruckner als Kirchenmusiker, G. Bosse, Regensburg, 1927
 Anton Bruckner – Sämtliche Werke, Band XXI: Kleine Kirchenmusikwerke, Musikwissenschaftlicher Verlag der Internationalen Bruckner-Gesellschaft, Hans Bauernfeind and Leopold Nowak (Editor), Vienna, 1984/2001
 Cornelis van Zwol, Anton Bruckner 1824–1896 – Leven en werken'', uitg. Thoth, Bussum, Netherlands, 2012.

External links 
 
 
 Afferentur regi F-Dur, WAB 1 Critical discography by Hans Roelofs 
 Can be heard on YouTube:
A live performance by Johannes Kleinjung with the Universitätschor, München (2011):  Afferentur regi
A live performance by Gilles Michels with the Student Choir of Utrecht (24 June 2017): Afferentur regi – Bruckner | USKO 
A live performance by Andrew Lewis with the Elgin Master Chorale (26 February 2018): Bruckner - Afferentur regi, WAB 1

Motets by Anton Bruckner
1861 compositions
Compositions in F major